Kyle Langford (born 2 February 1996) is a British middle-distance runner competing primarily in the 800 metres. He was the 2015 European Junior Champion and represented his country at the 2015 World Championships.. At the 2017 World Championships in London he was placed 4th, narrowly missing out on a bronze medal. Earlier he won a bronze medal at the 2013 World Youth Championships.In August 2022 he set his personal best time of 1.44.49 winning in Rovereto.

Semi Finalist World Athletics Championships Eugene 2022

Competition record

Personal bests
Outdoor
800 metres – 1:44.49 Rovereto 2022 
1500 metres – 3:52.06 (Hendon 2013)
Indoor
800 metres – 1:46.79 (Birmingham 2017)

References

Living people
1996 births
Sportspeople from Watford
English male middle-distance runners
British male middle-distance runners
Commonwealth Games silver medallists for England
Commonwealth Games medallists in athletics
Athletes (track and field) at the 2018 Commonwealth Games
World Athletics Championships athletes for Great Britain
British Athletics Championships winners
Medallists at the 2018 Commonwealth Games